Iniquitous is an American death metal band from San Antonio, Texas.

Discography

Return to Deeds of Old
Return to Deeds of Old is an EP by  Iniquitous.

"Mechanical Pleasures"

"Mechanical Pleasures" is a song by American Death Metal band Iniquitous for UFC fighter Angela Hill.

Splits and compilations
Limb Splitter II (2012)

References

American death metal musical groups